The State Security Council of Turkmenistan is an important decision-making body in the field of the defence of Turkmenistan. It is the highest decision-making body in the armed forces next to the Ministry of Defense and the General Staff, with its members directly advising the President of Turkmenistan on matters of national security.

According to the 1995 Law on defence, the council is chaired by the President of Turkmenistan, who can define the powers and actions of the Security Council. The Security Council was first mentioned in the 2003 Constitution of Turkmenistan, with it noting that in the president's role as supreme commander-in-chief, he/she can convene sessions of the council, as well as dismiss and promote members of the council. It was originally led by President Saparmurat Niyazov until his death in 2006. During this time Major General Agageldi Mammetgeldiyev served as the council's secretary. Gurbanguly Berdimuhamedow succeeded Niyazov after the latter's death. The current secretary of the council is Begench Gundogdyev.

Members

Secretaries of the Council
Muhammet Nazarov (April 1997 - March 2002)
Rejepbay Arazov (2 January 2003–24 October 2004)
Army General Agageldi Mammetgeldiyev (24 October 2004–21 January 2009)
Major General Yaylym Berdiyev (21 January 2009–22 January 2020)
Colonel General of Police Çarymyrat Amanow (22 January 2020–6 April 2022)
Lieutenant General Begench Gundogdyev (6 April 2022–present)

See also
 Armed Forces of Turkmenistan
 Ministry of Defense (Turkmenistan)
 Ministry of Internal Affairs (Turkmenistan)
 Ministry of National Security (Turkmenistan)
 Chief of the General Staff (Turkmenistan)
 Turkmen National Guard
 Turkmen Ground Forces
 Turkmen Air Force 
 Turkmen Navy
 Security Council (disambiguation)

References

Government of Turkmenistan
Military of Turkmenistan
Turlmenistan